Ireby is a civil parish in Lancaster, Lancashire, England. It contains five listed buildings that are recorded in the National Heritage List for England.  Of these, two are listed at Grade II*, the middle grade, and the others are at Grade II, the lowest grade.  The parish contains the small settlement of Ireby, and is otherwise rural.  The most important building in the parish is Over Hall; this and its stables are listed.  The other listed buildings consist of a house, a farmhouse, and a clapper bridge.

Key

Buildings

References

Citations

Sources

Lists of listed buildings in Lancashire
Buildings and structures in the City of Lancaster